Marc Eyraud (1 March 1924 – 15 February 2005) was a French film actor. He appeared in 60 films between 1956 and 1995.

Partial filmography

 Plucking the Daisy (1956) - Un photographe (uncredited)
 The Man in the Raincoat (1957) - Petit rôle (uncredited)
 Les Misérables (1958) - Grantaire
 Taxi, Roulotte et Corrida (1958) - Le douanier espagnol
 Le mouton (1960) - Le passant qui demande du feu (uncredited)
 Le coeur battant (1960) - Le directeur de la galerie
 Léon Morin, Priest (1961) - Anton
 Par-dessus le mur (1961) - Un père
 The Immoral Moment (1962) - Le metteur en scène
 Ballade pour un voyou (1963) - Le radiologue
 La belle vie (1963) - Le photographe (uncredited)
 Diary of a Chambermaid (1964) - Le secrétaire du commissaire
 A Taste for Women (1964) - Rocard
 Le Bonheur (1965) - J. Forestier - le frère de François
 The Wise Guys (1965) - L'éducateur
 Beatrice (1965) - Giacomo
 The Nun (1966) - Le père Seraphin
 The Gardener of Argenteuil (1966) - Le voisin de Martin (uncredited)
 Belle de Jour (1967) - Barman (uncredited)
 Lamiel (1967) - Monsieur Hautemare
 Lettre à Carla (1967) - Giacomo
 Les patates (1969) - Maurice
 The Confession (1970) - Un politique
 Elise, or Real Life (1970) - Un raciste au café (uncredited)
 L'araignée d'eau (1970) - Bernard
 Traîté du rossignol (1971) - Le cycliste
 It Only Happens to Others (1971)
 Boulevard du Rhum (1971) - Le toubib
 Un peu de soleil dans l'eau froide (1971) - Monsieur Rouargue
 La Scoumoune (1972) - Bonne Aventure - un prisonnier
 Défense de savoir (1973) - Le témoin
 Vogue la galère (1973, TV Movie) - Le défroqué
 Plaies et bosses (1974, TV Movie) - Dooling
 Borsalino & Co. (1974) - Le médecin-chef de l'asile (uncredited)
 Aloïse (1975) - Le père d'Aloïse
 The Gypsy (1975) - Le médecin
 Un sac de billes (1975) - Le curé du train
 Les oeufs brouillés (1976)
 Boomerang (1976) - Andreï (uncredited)
 Coup de Grâce (1976) - Dr. Paul Rugen
 Moi, Pierre Rivière, ayant égorgé ma mère, ma sœur et mon frère... (1976) - Le curé Suriray
 Le Gang (1977) - Le prêtre
 The Simple Past (1977) - Le docteur Mercier
 La Menace (1977) - Examining Magistrate Baron
 The Little Wheedlers (1978) - Le libraire
 Perceval le Gallois (1978) - Le Roi Arthur
 La gueule du loup (1981) - Le garagiste
 A Thousand Billion Dollars (1982) - Sylvestre
 La sonate des spectres (2015) - Un pensionnaire de la maison de retraite

External links

1924 births
2005 deaths
Actors from Saint-Étienne
French male film actors
20th-century French male actors